The 1832 United States presidential election in Maryland took place between November 2 and December 5, 1832, as part of the 1832 United States presidential election. Voters chose 10 representatives, or electors to the Electoral College, who voted for President and Vice President.

While Maryland voted for the National Republican candidate, Henry Clay, over the Democratic Party candidate, Andrew Jackson, by a mere four votes, this is irrelevant because electors weren't awarded based on the statewide vote. They were chosen in four district elections. A total of ten electoral votes were allocated, with five going to Clay and three to Jackson, while two electors failed to cast votes. In terms of raw votes cast, Clay's four-vote margin is the smallest between two major candidates in any state in any presidential election in United States history.

Results

Results by electoral district

Results by county

Counties that flipped from National Republican to Democratic
Harford
Queen Anne's

Counties that flipped from Democratic to National Republican
Worcester

See also
 United States presidential elections in Maryland
 1832 United States presidential election
 1832 United States elections

Notes

References 

Maryland
1832
Presidential